Section 123 of the United States Atomic Energy Act of 1954, titled "Cooperation With Other Nations", establishes an agreement for cooperation as a prerequisite for nuclear deals between the US and any other nation. Such an agreement is called a 123 Agreement. To date, the U.S. has entered into roughly twenty-three 123 Agreements with 48 countries.
Countries with which the U.S. has or had or is working towards having a 123 Agreement include:
 Morocco
 Ukraine

 Japan (with automatic re-processing rights)
 Euratom (with automatic re-processing rights)
 China (with re-processing rights, requiring approval per each request)
 Switzerland
 India (With advance consent to reprocessing)
 Russia (On September 8, 2008 Pres. George W. Bush notified the United States Congress that there was no basis for further consideration of a 123 agreement with Russia.)
 United Arab Emirates
 Egypt
 Thailand
 Argentina
 Australia 
 Bangladesh
 Brazil
 Canada  
 Colombia
 Indonesia
 International Atomic Energy Agency (IAEA)
 Turkey
 Kazakhstan	
 Republic of Korea 
 South Africa
 Taiwan

Proposed 

 Philippines
 Romania

References

External links
123 Agreement With India
 Text of 123 Agreement with India
 Details of Indian 123 Agreement package before Congress

123 Agreement With UAE
 U.S. to Sign Nuclear Pact With U.A.E. Wall Street Journal, January 14, 2009
 U.S.-United Arab Emirates Memorandum of Understanding on Nuclear Energy Cooperation, State Department
Resources on the United Arab Emirates Nuclear Energy Program
Voice of America News, December 12, 2008

Energy in the United States
Treaties of the United Arab Emirates
Treaties of the United States
Energy treaties
Treaties of Morocco
Treaties of Ukraine
Treaties of Romania
Treaties of Japan
Treaties of the People's Republic of China
Treaties of Switzerland
Treaties of India
Treaties of Russia
Treaties of Egypt
Treaties of Thailand
Treaties of Argentina
Treaties of Australia
Treaties of Bangladesh
Treaties of Brazil
Treaties of Canada
Treaties of Colombia
Treaties of Indonesia
Treaties of Turkey
Treaties of Kazakhstan
Treaties of South Korea
Treaties of South Africa
Treaties of Taiwan
Nuclear technology treaties

ta:123 உடன்படிக்கை